Karl Maier (1901 – 25 July 2000) was a German Esperantist and member of the Universala Esperanto Asocio, for more than 50 years.

Maier learned Esperanto in 1924. After emigration from Germany in 1930, he was living with Esperanto enthusiasts among United States, Mexico and Japan. Between 1935 and 1955 he lived in China.

After his return to Germany, he managed to unite several esperantists, reaching over 300 subscribers for the Chinese magazin El Popola Ĉinio (The Chinese People); promoted the regular Esperanto conventions in East Berlin (beginning in 1960) and fought for the legalization of the Esperanto language in the GDR.

Legacy

He died in Berlin at the age of 99. Maier’s testament established that his fortune should be donated to the Esperanto-Ligo Berlin and the Esperanto Movement in China. Resolving this legal situation took several years to the league.

The Berlin part of the inheritance was invested to build the Germana Esperanta Kultura Centro, new home of the Berlin Esperanto Movement.

References

Ulrich Lins, Mit 99 ein glücklicher Mensch - Karl Maiers langes Leben in Ostasien und Deutschland, in Esperanto aktuell, March, 2000. pp. 12–13
Fritz Wollenberg, Ni funebras pri Karl Maier (1901-2000), in Berlina Informilo, September 2000.

German Esperantists
1901 births
2000 deaths
East German culture
German male writers
German expatriates in the United States
German expatriates in Mexico
German expatriates in Japan
German expatriates in China